Deep Creek may refer to:

Communities

Australia 
 Deep Creek, Queensland
 Deep Creek, South Australia 
 Deep Creek, now Eganstown, Victoria

Canada 
 Deep Creek, Alberta, an unincorporated area

United States 
 Deep Creek, California, now Cedarville
 Deep Creek, Florida, an unincorporated community in Charlotte County
 Deep Creek, Virginia, a former unincorporated town of the former Norfolk County
 Deep Creek, Accomack County, Virginia, a census-designated place
 Deep Creek Township (disambiguation)

Bodies of water

Australia 
 Deep Creek (Melbourne), a tributary of the Maribyrnong River
 Deep Creek Dam (Tumbarumba, New South Wales), a dam on Deep Creek (Tooma River tributary)

Bahamas 
Deep Creek (Bahamas)

United States 
 Deep Creek (Mojave River tributary), San Bernardino County, California
 Deep Creek (Appoquinimink River tributary), New Castle County, Delaware
 Deep Creek (Nanticoke River tributary), Sussex County, Delaware
 Deep Creek (Great Salt Lake), Idaho and Utah
 Deep Creek Lake, Maryland
 Deep Creek (Montana), a stream in Flathead County, Montana
 Deep Creek (Little River tributary), a stream in Hoke County, North Carolina
 Deep Creek (Mahantango Creek tributary), Dauphin County, Pennsylvania
 Deep Creek (Pine Creek tributary), Schuylkill County, Pennsylvania
 Deep Creek (Soque River tributary), Georgia
 Deep Creek (Owyhee County, Idaho), a tributary of the Owyhee River in southwestern Idaho
 Deep Creek (Texas), a tributary of the Texas Colorado River
 Deep Creek (Tooele County, Utah)
 Deep Creek (Appomattox River tributary), Virginia
 Deep Creek (Washington), a tributary of the Spokane River

Other uses 
 Deep Creek Preserve (Desoto County, Florida), a 2,000 acre preserve 
 Deep Creek Preserve (Volusia County, Florida), an 8,040 acre preserve
 Deep Creek (2010 novel)
 Deep Creek Conservation Park, South Australia
 Deep Creek High School, Virginia
 Deep Creek Hot Springs, California
 Deep Creek massacre, occurring May 1887 in Oregon
 Deep Creek Mountains, Utah
 Deep Creek State Recreation Area, Alaska

See also
Deep River (disambiguation)